Mostefa Ben-Boulaïd (5 February 1917 – 22 March 1956) was an Algerian revolutionary leader.

Biography

World War II
Ben-Boulaid was born in Arris, Batna Province, Algeria.  In 1939, he underwent mandatory military service and was mobilized to fight for the allies during the Second World War. In 1944, during the Italian campaign, Ben-Boulaid exhibited courage, which earned him the Military Medal  and the Croix de Guerre. He was demobilised with the rank of adjutant, returned home, and joined the Algerian People's Party (PPA).

Revolutionary figure

Ben-Boulaid became an important political and military figure in the Special Organization (OS). He bought weapons with his own funds, supported militants being pursued by the French authorities and distributed arms. 
Ben-Boulaid contested the Assembly of Algeria election of 1948 and won decisively. However, the results were falsified by the French authorities.
He was a founding member of the Revolutionary Committee of Unity and Action (CRUA). From 22–25 June 1954, he chaired a crucial meeting which aimed to unite the revolutionary forces. He became a member of the "Committee of the Six" ( the insurgent leaders). During the Algerian war, Ben-Boulaid was responsible for Area I (Aurès). He engaged heavily armed French forces and suffered heavy losses. In 1955, he traveled to Libya to purchase arms. He participated in the battle of Ifri el blah and the battle of Ahmar Khaddou near Batna.

Arrest and escape
On 11 February 1955, Ben-Boulaid was arrested in Tunisia. Ben-Boulaid was imprisoned at "Coudiat Aty" Central Prison in Constantine and was sentenced to death. In November 1955, with the complicity of a prison warden, Djaffer Chérif, who was from Ben-Boulaid's home town, Ben-Boulaid escaped, along with other prisoners. One of the other prisoners was Tahar Zbiri, who went on to initiate a failed coup against President Houari Boumediene in 1967. During the escape, one of Ben-Boulaid's comrades was injured, recaptured, and subsequently decapitated.

Death
On 22 March 1956, Ben-Boulaïd died in the blast of a parachuted French radio bomb.

Gallery

Legacy
The main squares of Batna and Arris host busts of Ben-Boulaid. In Batna, an alley and a high school was named for him. In Annaba, one of the avenues that connects Bertagna boulevard (formerly Cours Bertagna) and the Avenue of the Revolution bears his name as do the neighborhoods of Saint-Cloud, Plaisance and Kouba, and beaches and Chapuis Toche. The airport of Batna is named after Ben-Boulaid.

Film 
In 2006-2007, Ahmed Rachedi produced a documentary called, A film about Ben-Boulaïd in collaboration with the Ministry of Veterans (Ministère des Moudjahidine) and the Ministry of Culture (Ministère de la culture et l'entreprise) and Missane Balkis films. It was part of the 2007 festival, "Algiers, Capital of Arab Culture" ("Alger, capitale de la culture arabe 2007").

Similar Wikipedia articles 
Krim Belkacem
History of Algeria

Books 
Au forgeron de Batna,  Jean-Pierre Marin, foreword by Jean Deleplanque

See also

 Declaration of 1 November 1954

References

External links 
Biographic article in Monde, Algeria, (Biographie sur Algérie-Monde.com)
Photo in a gallery of Algeria's revolution heroes (Elias Filali Pbase)
Official FLN website (site consacré au Front de libération nationale), at Jeeran.com.

1917 births
1956 deaths
Algerian People's Party politicians
Algerian revolutionaries
Berber rebels
Chaoui people
People from Batna Province
Members of the National Liberation Front (Algeria)
20th-century Algerian people
French military personnel of World War II